Ahmed Tangeaoui (born May 29, 1982) is a French-Moroccan football striker. He currently plays for Évreux FC.

Career
Tangeaoui began his career with SM Caen before moving to Championnat de France Amateurs 2 team Évreux AC in 2003. In the summer of 2004 he moved to league rival FC Bayeux, leaving the team in 2005 to join Beauvais. He played in Ligue 2 for Angers SCO after signing with AS Beauvais Oise in the summer of 2006.

In January 2008, Tangeaoui signed with the Emirati club Dubai Club, but left after 6 months to return to France upon signing a contract with Paris FC. In July 2009, he returned to Évreux after Paris FC passed on signing him to a new contract.

References

1982 births
Living people
French footballers
AS Beauvais Oise players
Angers SCO players
Association football forwards
Évreux FC 27 players